German submarine U-656 was a German Type VIIC U-boat built for the Nazi Germany's Kriegsmarine for service during World War II. She was ordered on 9 October 1939 and the keel laid on 4 September 1940. Construction on U-656 was carried out by Hamburg company Howaldtswerke as yard number 805. She was launched on 8 July 1941 and commissioned on 17 September 1941.

Design
German Type VIIC submarines were preceded by the shorter Type VIIB submarines. U-656 had a displacement of  when at the surface and  while submerged. She had two shafts and two  propellers.

U-656 was fitted with five  torpedo tubes (four fitted at the bow and one at the stern), fourteen torpedoes, one  SK C/35 naval gun, 220 rounds, and a  C/30 anti-aircraft gun. The boat had a complement of between forty-four and sixty.

Service history

U-656 went into service initially with 5th U-boat Flotilla for training from 17 September 1941 until 31 December 1941. She moved into operational service with 1st U-boat Flotilla on 1 January 1942, and was commanded by Kapitänleutnant Ernst Kröning.

U-656 made two patrols, but did not sink any ships. Her first patrol lasted almost two weeks: after departing Kiel on 15 January 1942, she put in at Brest, France on 28 January. The submarine departed Brest on 4 February, but never completed her second patrol. She was sunk with all hands by depth charges dropped by a United States Navy PBO-1 Hudson of Patrol Squadron 82 (VP-82) on 1 March 1942 south of Cape Race, Newfoundland. U-656 became the first U-boat to be sunk by the U.S. Navy in World War II.

References

Bibliography

External links

German Type VIIC submarines
U-boats commissioned in 1941
U-boats sunk in 1942
U-boats sunk by US aircraft
World War II submarines of Germany
World War II shipwrecks in the Atlantic Ocean
Shipwrecks of the Newfoundland and Labrador coast
1941 ships
U-boats sunk by depth charges
Ships built in Hamburg
Ships lost with all hands
Maritime incidents in March 1942